Merja may refer to

 Merja, Estonia, a village in Estonia
 Merja (name), a Finnish female name

See also 
 Merya (disambiguation)